Ulla Johannsen (also credited as Milla Johansson) is an actress known for her appearances in supporting roles in various Italian films during the 1970s, such as The Sicilian Checkmate (1972), Flatfoot (1973), My Friends (1975), and Liebes Lager (1976).

While shooting an outdoor scene for the film Beach House (1978) on the bank of a stream near Viterbo, in which Johannsen and other actresses (including Ely Galleani) were completely naked, a crowd of onlookers gathered causing a traffic jam, so much so that soon after the police had to intervene which led the actresses to the police station, only to be released shortly after.

Filmography

References

Citations

Bibliography

External links
 

Italian film actresses
20th-century Italian actresses
Living people
Year of birth missing (living people)